Richard "Cy" LeBlanc (born March 18, 1955 in Dieppe, New Brunswick) is a politician in the province of New Brunswick, Canada.

LeBlanc graduated from the University of Moncton with a  Bachelor's degree in Leisure Studies, and worked in sales. In 1994 he worked to promote the World Acadian Congress.

A member of the Progressive Conservative Party of New Brunswick, he was elected to the Legislative Assembly of New Brunswick in 1999 and re-elected in 2003 and 2006.

For the 55th session of the legislature (2003–2006), he served as Deputy Speaker.

Leblanc is married to Jocelyne Arsenault.

References
MLA Bios, Government of New Brunswick

1955 births
Living people
Université de Moncton alumni
Progressive Conservative Party of New Brunswick MLAs
Acadian people
People from Dieppe, New Brunswick
21st-century Canadian politicians